Paul Angelo Vallone (born June 2, 1967) is American politician and attorney who served as the Council member for the 19th district of the New York City Council from 2014 to 2021. He is a Democrat. His district included Alley Pond Park, Bay Terrace, Bayside, College Point, Douglaston, East Elmhurst, Flushing, Fresh Meadows, Little Neck and Whitestone in Queens.

Life and career
An attorney, Vallone served as the managing partner for Vallone & Vallone, LLP and has been admitted to the New York and New Jersey Bar Associations since 1992.

Vallone's father is Peter Vallone Sr., and his brother is Peter Vallone Jr. His grandfather was Charles J. Vallone. A Vallone has served on the City Council since 1974. He and his wife, Anna-Marie Sardarian, live in Flushing, New York with their three children.

Vallone currently serves as the Deputy Commissioner of External Affairs for Department of Veterans’ Services.

New York City Council
Vallone initially ran for the New York City Council in 2009, but came in third in the Democratic primary for the 19th district. In the 2013 Democratic primary election for the same seat, Vallone defeated Austin Shafran. He defeated Republican Party nominee Dennis Saffran in the general election.

References

External links
New York City Councilman Paul Vallone (official site)
Council Member Paul Vallone on Facebook
@PaulVallone (official Twitter)

Living people
New York (state) Democrats
Vallone family
New York City Council members
Place of birth missing (living people)
New York (state) lawyers
1967 births
Fordham University alumni
St. John's University School of Law alumni
21st-century American politicians
People from Flushing, Queens